Route 285 is a 48 km two-lane north/south highway on the south shore of the Saint Lawrence River in the Chaudière-Appalaches region of Quebec, Canada. Its northern terminus is in L'Islet at the junction of Route 132 and the southern terminus is close to Saint-Adalbert at the junction of Route 204.

Towns along Route 285
 Saint-Adalbert
 Saint-Marcel
 Saint-Cyrille-de-Lessard
 L'Islet

See also
 List of Quebec provincial highways

References

External links 
 Provincial Route Map (Courtesy of the Quebec Ministry of Transportation) 
Route 285 on Google Maps

285